John Master was an English physician.

John Master may also refer to:

John Master (MP) for Sandwich (UK Parliament constituency)

See also

John Masters (disambiguation)